The 1963 Baylor Bears football team represented Baylor University in the Southwest Conference (SWC) during the 1963 NCAA University Division football season. In their fifth season under head coach John Bridgers, the Bears compiled an 8–3 record (6–1 against conference opponents), finished in second place in the conference, defeated LSU in the 1963 Bluebonnet Bowl, and outscored all opponents by a combined total of 205 to 120. They played their home games at Baylor Stadium in Waco, Texas.

The team's statistical leaders included Don Trull with 2,157 passing yards and 60 points scored, Dalton Hoffman with 458 rushing yards, and Larry Elkins with 873 receiving yards. Trull and Bobby Crenshaw were the team captains.

Schedule

References

Baylor
Baylor Bears football seasons
Bluebonnet Bowl champion seasons
Baylor Bears football